Jinji Lake (literally Golden Rooster Lake) is a fresh water lake located in the central part of Suzhou Industrial Park, Jiangsu, China. There are two man-made islands in the lake.

Tourism 
The lake is one of the largest inland lakes in China. The northern and western shores of the lake is concentrated on shopping and entertainment amenities. The green spaces are along the eastern and southern shore.

See also 
 Dushu Lake
 Suzhou Ferris Wheel

References

External links 
 

AAAAA-rated tourist attractions
Lakes of Suzhou
Suzhou Industrial Park
Jinji